Tudor Teodorescu-Braniște (April 12, 1899 – March 23, 1969) was a Romanian journalist. Born in Pitești, he was editor at a number of newspapers, including Adevărul and, from 1944 to 1947, Jurnalul de Dimineaţă, which was ultimately suspended from publishing due to his and his staff's steadfast refusal to adopt a pro-Soviet stance. He died in Bucharest.

Notes

1899 births
1969 deaths
People from Pitești
Adevărul editors
Romanian newspaper editors